The Tisza culture is a Neolithic archaeological culture of the Alföld plain in modern-day Hungary, Western Romania, Eastern Slovakia, and Ukrainian Zakarpattia Oblast in Central Europe. The culture is dated to between 5400 BCE and 4500/4400 BCE.


Artefacts

House reconstruction

Genetics
Lipson et al. (2017) analyzed the remains of five individuals ascribed to the Tisza culture. The three males were G-P15, I-P37 and I-P215. mtDNA extracted were various subclades of U, H, T, and K.

References

External links

'Face Pot', Institute for the Study of the Ancient World
'Female figurine', Institute for the Study of the Ancient World

Archaeological cultures of Central Europe
Neolithic cultures of Europe
Archaeological cultures in Hungary
Archaeological cultures in Romania
Archaeological cultures in Slovakia
Archaeological cultures in Ukraine

sv:Bandkeramiska kulturen#Tiszakulturen